The Treason Act 1939 is an Act of the Oireachtas (Parliament) of the Republic of Ireland. It provides for the punishment of treason and related offences.

Article 39 of the 1937 Constitution of Ireland defines treason as follows:

Section 1 of the Treason Act provides that treason can be committed by anyone in Ireland, or outside Ireland by any citizen or resident of Ireland. It was a capital offence, until the death penalty was abolished in 1990. The sentence now is life imprisonment, with parole in not less than 40 years.

Section 2 states that anyone who "encourages, harbours, or comforts any person whom he knows or has reasonable grounds for believing to be engaged in committing treason shall be guilty of felony."

The Act also provides that "No person shall be convicted of treason on the uncorroborated evidence of one witness." This also applies to the offence under section 2.

Section 3 deals with misprision of treason.

The 1939 Act replaced the Treasonable Offences Act 1925. Before 1925 treason was defined by the laws of the United Kingdom, most notably the Treason Act 1351.

See also
Offences against the State Acts 1939–1998
Treason (Ireland) Act 1854

References

External links
Original text of the Treason Act 1939, as enacted, from official government website "Irish Statute Book"
Original text of the Treasonable Offences Act 1925, as enacted

Law of the Republic of Ireland
Irish criminal law
Treason in Ireland
Acts of the Oireachtas of the 1930s
1939 in Irish law